Niels Laulund Henriksen (born 4 February 1966) is a Danish competition rower and Olympic champion.

Henriksen won a gold medal in lightweight coxless four at the 1996 Summer Olympics. At world championships, he won one gold and three silver medals between 1989 and 1995.

References

1966 births
Living people
Danish male rowers
Olympic rowers of Denmark
Rowers at the 1996 Summer Olympics
Olympic gold medalists for Denmark
Olympic medalists in rowing
Medalists at the 1996 Summer Olympics
World Rowing Championships medalists for Denmark